Comoros made its Paralympic Games debut at the 2012 Summer Paralympics in London, sending one representative (Hassani Ahamada Djae) to compete in swimming.

Medal tables

Medals by Summer Games

See also
Comoros at the Olympics

External links
International Paralympic Committee

References